The Church and Convent of los Dominicos of the Colonial City of Santo Domingo in the Dominican Republic, is the oldest Catholic building in continuous use in the Americas, and also, according to the UNESCO, it was the headquarters of the first university in the Americas, which was called the Universidad Santo Tomás de Aquino. Today it is part of the Colonial City complex, as a World Heritage Site.

History

The Church and Convent of los Dominicos is one of the oldest European buildings in the American continent. Its construction begins with the arrival of the Dominican Order in Santo Domingo, around 1510.

By 1517, the convent was inhabited by the friars, although it was not yet finished. In 1530 the church was in the completion stage, between the years 1531–1532, by Carmonese architects Antón and Alonso Gutiérrez; its official inauguration took place, with the presence of the friars Pedro de Córdoba, Reginaldo de Montesino, Bartolomé de las Casas and Antonio de Montesinos, the latter, he was the one who said the famous Sermón de Adviento in 1511, and who reprimanded the court of Diego Columbus for the mistreatment of the Natives, thus beginning the so-called Derecho de Gentes, which became one of the main controversies of the 16th century. thus generating the first controversy of the New World.

In 1534 the convent began its classes, and in 1538 it became the first university in the Americas, which was called the Universidad Santo Tomás de Aquino and later the Primate University of America, which today we know as the Autonomous University of Santo Domingo. (UASD). This began under the mandate of the Bula In Apostolatus Culmine, which was blessed by Pope Paul III, this university also had the characteristic of the University of Salamanca.

One of the main specialties of this university was Theology, from which great important figures of the colonial life of the time emerged. Great personalities from the Antilles and Mainland were trained at this university. During the 1540s, the church reached one of its greatest peaks, in this area of ​​study and university education and training.

The church and convent have a beautiful façade, with great splendor, since the Gothic, Isabelline Gothic and Baroque architecture stands out, which greatly predominated in the constructions of the time, not only in the country but also throughout Americas. In the building there are valuable images and statues, which were the work of the Sevillian brothers Jorge and Ajejo Fernández, and at the beginning of the 16th century, it had five altarpieces by one of the most famous Spanish painters of the colonial era, Juan Martínez Montañés.

Over the years, to this day, the church has undergone major changes and severe damage to its architecture, one of which was in 1545 with the passage of a hurricane, and during the passage of the pirate Francis Drake, it was the only building that did not suffer any damage, since the famous pirate of the time respected the sanctuaries. During the years 1684 and 1673, two earthquakes occurred on the island, respectively, which hit the island hard, destroying its roof and some rooms. In 1746 the building was restored again, with a different structure on each of its facades, thus imposing the Baroque style. In 1825, the church was closed by the Haitian government, although some time later it was a shelter for several religious orders and in 1954 the Dominicans returned to the country and recovered their old home.

Inside the Church is the Chapel of Our Lady of the Rosary, which was built in 1649. In this chapel, the Virgin of the Rosary, who is the patron saint of the Dominicans, was venerated.

High on the wall of the eastern length, a grave (the only one on the island) is a further echo of Isabeline Gothic.

In the modifications of 1746, the chapel was rebuilt by the new owners of the chapel, the Campuzano Polanco family, who replaced the wooden frame of the nave with the current barrel vault. This vault of the chapel was decorated with the twelve signs of the zodiac around the sun, and for this reason it is also called the "Chapel of the Zodiac". Also in the vault there are other characters such as the Twelve Olympians who represent the four seasons. This chapel is unique in the Americas of its kind and one of the three vaults with astrological representations that currently exist in the world, together with the Chapel of Salamanca and Río Seco.

Location

The Church and Convent of los Dominicos is located on Calle Padre Billini, in the Colonial area, in the city of Santo Domingo de Guzmán, Dominican Republic.

Gallery

See also
Universidad Santo Tomás de Aquino
List of colonial buildings in Santo Domingo
List of oldest buildings in the Americas

References

External links

Church and Convent of los Dominicos' Official website

Roman Catholic churches in Santo Domingo
Ciudad Colonial (Santo Domingo)
1532 establishments in the Spanish Empire
Roman Catholic churches completed in 1532
1532 establishments in North America
Educational institutions established in the 1530s
Gothic architecture in the Dominican Republic
Isabelline architecture in the Dominican Republic
Baroque architecture in the Dominican Republic
Dominican convents